The Yamaha T-150 is an underbone manufactured by Yamaha Motor Company since 2015. It is known as the Exciter 150/155 in Thailand and Vietnam, Sniper 150 MXi in the Philippines and Singapore, Jupiter MX/MX King 150 in Indonesia, and Y15/Y16ZR in Malaysia.



Model updates

2018 
In August 2018, the T-150 received some updates. The bike received a LED headlamp, wider front tire and different handlebar cowl that also houses a LCD instrument panel, from the previous version combination analogue/digital gauge, which is complemented by a passing light switch, engine kill switch and alarm fob. The bike is also claimed to be  heavier than the previous version. The engine 
specifications remain the same.

2021 
On 29 December 2020, the T-150 received a major upgrade. The engine displacement has increased to 155 cc, complemented with VVA system.

References

External links 
  (Indonesia)

T-150
T-150
Motorcycles introduced in 2015